The Verkhovna Rada of Ukraine of the 5th convocation was the convocation of the legislative branch of the Verkhovna Rada, Ukraine's unicameral parliament from May 25, 2006 until November 23, 2007.

The 5th Verkhovna Rada's composition was based upon the results of the inconclusive March 26, 2006 parliamentary election, a little over a year after the conclusion of the Orange Revolution. During the 2007 political crisis, President Viktor Yushchenko dissolved the parliament on April 2, 2007, forcing the subsequent snap election, which would decide the composition of the 6th and next convocation of parliament.

See also
 Second Yanukovych Government

References

External links
 

Ukrainian parliaments
Fifth convocation members of the Verkhovna Rada